Kaldor City is a series of audio plays using elements from the British TV series Doctor Who and Blake's 7. Many of the elements borrowed from these series for use in Kaldor City were originated by Chris Boucher, who wrote for Doctor Who and was script editor for all four seasons of Blake's 7. The series, produced by Magic Bullet Productions, was released on CD beginning in 2001.

Within the stories, Kaldor City is a major humanoid city of the future "on a corrupt world governed by an all-powerful Company, where the rich scheme in mansions filled with robot slaves, the poor scrabble for survival in the Sewerpits, the Security forces are out of control and terrorism is a daily fact of life". It was first mentioned in the 1977 Doctor Who serial The Robots of Death as the home base of a "storm mine" touring the desert searching for and mining precious minerals from within the sands, with the crew working on commission for the Company. Boucher reused Kaldor City in his 1999 novel Corpse Marker, part of the Doctor Who Past Doctor Adventures line.

Background
The society shown in The Robots of Death is one where higher class "founding families" (presumably a reference to the families that founded the colony planet) have hit financial difficulties and are forced to work with (and sometimes subordinate to) citizens who have achieved their power, influence and wealth through their own hard work and scheming. This has led to a certain amount of resentment between the new and old money, mirroring the decline in the financial power of the gentry in England. The society is also highly reliant on the use of robots at all levels, with three class of robot in use: Dum robots are for menial work, and are unable to speak; Voc robots are the next level up, and can speak, and have limited reasoning capabilities; Super-Voc robots are the most advanced, and can be used to monitor complex activities including the day-to-day activities of other, lower class robots. Each robot is given a designation based on its class (for example D-84 is a Dum class robot and SV-7 is a Super-Voc) and is programmed with a variant on Asimov's Three Laws of Robotics.

The society is not entirely comfortable with the use of robots; the machines' humanoid design but complete lack of emotion and body language has given rise to a mental disorder termed Robo-phobia. This is shown as a paranoid delusion that robots are actually the living dead, intent on harming humans. The Robots of Death also shows that it is possible to reprogram robots so that they can break the restrictions on harming humans, as robotics genius Taren Capel has discovered in his attempts to free his robot "brothers" from their 'slavery'.

Kaldor City is also the setting of the Past Doctor Adventure Corpse Marker, where we get to see the city and its ruling board of "Topmasters". At the time of Corpse Marker, the Board comprises twenty Topmasters from the founding families, and they are seen to be keen to keep anyone not from a founding family off the board. The novel also introduces the character of Carnell to Kaldor City, who is a psychostrategist on the run from a corrupt "Federation" and hiding out in the city whilst ingratiating himself with the board by helping them compose their strategies: Carnell is a character from one of Chris Boucher's Blake's 7 episodes, "Weapon", broadcast in 1979, and this novel is the first time that the fan-theory that Doctor Who and Blake's 7 take place in the same fictional universe has received any kind of semi-official recognition. This theory had its roots in a report that Blake's 7 creator Terry Nation wanted to introduce his Doctor Who monsters, the Daleks, into Blake's 7 but was prevented by the BBC.

The novel also introduces the concept of the sewer-pits, the slums of Kaldor City where the underclass try to scrape their living. The slums are the breeding ground of a new breed of terrorist, the Tarenists, who have adapted the teachings of the late Taren Capel into an almost religious doctrine, preaching the downfall of the ruling class at the hands of the robots. By the end of the novel, Topmaster Uvanov (formerly commander of the storm mine in The Robots of Death, and not a member of a founding family) has secured his succession to Chairholder of the Company Board.

Some of the plays in the series also feature the Fendahl: a race of creatures also created by Boucher in 1977, in the Doctor Who television serial Image of the Fendahl.

Audio plays
In 1999, Magic Bullet Productions approached Chris Boucher to discuss the possibility of creating a range of audio plays based on the characters and concepts from his previous work relating to Kaldor City. Boucher gave his permission, working closely with producer Alan Stevens in creating a vision consistent with all that had gone before whilst also creating a new and interesting ongoing story. Boucher also wrote the second of the releases, the play Death's Head.

The plays feature a cast principally drawn from actors who had appeared on television in Doctor Who or Blake's Seven, headed by Paul Darrow, Scott Fredericks and Russell Hunter, with, amongst others, David Baillie, David Collings, Philip Madoc, Peter Miles and Gregory de Polnay. They feature sound design, effects and music by Alistair Lock, and are co-directed by both Stevens and Lock.

The first three CDs make sense on their own, as standalone stories, but the final three form a serial, and should be listened to in order. From the early releases, it seemed that the series was telling a story of political intrigue and manipulation that was gearing towards the use of the robot workforce as a means of revolution, as shown previously in The Robots of Death and Corpse Marker. However, the fifth play, Checkmate by Alan Stevens, takes the theme of manipulation to a higher level, introducing the Fendahl from Boucher's Doctor Who serial Image of the Fendahl as the series's major villain, manipulating events in Kaldor City to ensure its own emergence. Once the Fendahl's involvement was made known, it was possible to return to the series's earlier instalments and see the emergence foreshadowed: for example, Uvanov is given a painting of a Fendahleen, and Carnell muses about the existence of an alien grand manipulator whose goals and methods would be unknowable.

Occam's Razor
Occam's Razor is the first play in the series, written by Alan Stevens and Jim Smith. It focuses on the arrival of a mysterious figure called Kaston Iago (named for the manipulative character from Shakespeare's Othello and the noted Shakespeare editor David Kastan, played by Paul Darrow) and his insinuation into the confidence of Chairholder Uvanov (played by Russell Hunter, reprising his role from The Robots of Death). Iago helps Uvanov solve a series of murders involving Company board members, and his success earns him a permanent position as Uvanov's new bodyguard. However, as the title hints, the simplest explanation is true: Iago has been committing the murders himself, and framing another board member, in order to gain Uvanov's trust.

Through the course of the play, Iago also meets Psychostrategist Carnell (Scott Fredericks, reprising his role from Blake's 7) and makes it clear that he knows what a psychostrategist is and knows about the Federation, with Carnell remarking that he must be the only other person on the planet with this information. Many fans of the series have taken this — combined with similarities in Darrow's performance — to mean that Kaston Iago is in fact Kerr Avon masquerading for his own reasons under an assumed name. Magic Bullet have neither confirmed nor denied this; and although other characters in the Kaldor City series (mainly those created by Chris Boucher) have been more explicitly linked to either Doctor Who or Blake's 7, because Boucher did not create Kerr Avon he has no ownership rights in the character.

Death's Head
Death's Head by Chris Boucher is the second play in the series, and features an investigation into the attempted murder of Chairholder Uvanov. The play sets up several ideas that are only resolved later in the series, such as the existence of Taren Capel's skull (although in this play, the skull is a fake) and several clashing schemes and plots that the Topmasters, Carnell and Iago are attempting to put into action. The play also introduces the character of Blayes, played by Tracy Russell, who features more prominently in the later plays.

Hidden Persuaders
Hidden Persuaders by Jim Smith and Fiona Moore is the third play in the series, and follows the attempts of a terrorist group called "The Church of Taren Capel" to commit an act of terrorism to further their cause. The Church has been infiltrated by Blayes, who is working for Chairholder Uvanov, and Kaston Iago is dispatched in an attempt to save her. Iago has also begun acting on his own suspicions, and is attempting to move against Carnell. The title of the play is derived from The Hidden Persuaders by media theorist Vance Packard and is partially an attempt to introduce some of the themes of his work into the series. The play reintroduces the character of Poul/Paullus from The Robots of Death, again played by David Collings.

Taren Capel
The fourth play in the series is Taren Capel by Alan Stevens, and focuses on Iago's attempt to get to the bottom of a scheme apparently instigated by Taren Capel before his death, and continued by the Church of Taren Capel. Iago discovers that Capel has already programmed several robots in Kaldor City to become killers, with only a trigger phrase — specified in his diary — required to activate them. The diary is also kept with Capel's genuine skull, recovered from the desert. The play closes with a grand piece of misdirection, with Iago managing to convince Uvanov of the danger but with the robots being triggered: this created expectations that the following plays would deal with a robot-destroyed city.

Taren Capel also saw the apparent departure of Carnell, although the character may have returned in the following play: it is likely, however, that the Carnell in Checkmate was a projection of Iago's mind and/or the Fendahl, rather than the actual psychostrategist.

Checkmate
Checkmate by Alan Stevens continues directly after the events of Taren Capel, and whilst it ostensibly deals with Uvanov and Iago's struggle to contain the threat of the killer robots, it becomes clear as the play progresses that another plot is being hatched: the Church of Taren Capel seem more concerned with Capel's skull than with his diaries, and eventually the skull is used to bring forth the Fendahl (mirroring events in the television serial Image of the Fendahl). At the close of the play, Iago is shot and apparently dying, when the Fendahl (through Iago's paramour) offers him a deal. This seems to involve him going back in time and killing his lover, although this may have been an illusion created by the Fendahl for its own ends.

Following the release of this play, and the death of Russell Hunter, it was generally assumed that the Kaldor City audios had reached a natural end.

The Prisoner
This was a 20 minute play featuring Paul Darrow and Peter Miles reprising roles they had played in the Kaldor City series, written by Alan Stevens and Fiona Moore for release on the CD The Actor Speaks: Paul Darrow, produced by MJTV. The play features an interrogation between Kaston Iago and Firstmaster Landerchild, whereby Iago attempts to convince his interrogator that they are both figments of something else's imagination. In fact, this is a technique that appears to work so well that by the end of the play, both characters seem to disappear.

The title refers to the writers' interest in the ATV series The Prisoner, and whilst it also suggests that (like that TV series) the main theme of the Kaldor City series may be the nature of reality and fiction, it also suggests (again, like the TV series) that definite answers may not be forthcoming.

Storm Mine
The final play in the series is Storm Mine by Daniel O'Mahony. It centres on the character of Blayes, who awakens on a storm mine going round in circles in the desert. She is joined by a series of strange characters, and the disembodied voice of Kaston Iago frustratedly trying to get her to act to his will. The story at first glance seems to bear no real connection to the series as a whole, although it is suggested that Kaldor City itself is quarantined due to the killer robots. However, there are several hints within the play that all is not as it seems — for example, several of the characters bear similarities to characters from earlier plays, such as Philip Madoc's Commander sharing mannerisms with Russell Hunter's Uvanov, himself once a storm mine Commander. The Fendahl also appears in the play, apparently manipulating the crew and one of its robots for its own ends, and it has been suggested that in fact the play is demonstrating what it feels like for the characters to be assimilated into the Fendahl's gestalt entity.

When questioned on the play's apparent lack of connection to the previous instalments, producer and writer Alan Stevens often directs listeners to the analysis of the play by author Dale Smith, posted to Outpost Gallifrey's forums.

Metafiction
On 26 March 2011, a 15-minute Kaldor City play written by Alan Stevens and Fiona Moore was performed by Paul Darrow and Patricia Merrick at the Sci-Fi-London film festival. This play was subsequently recorded under the title Metafiction and released in 2012 as a direct download. The play takes the form of a dialogue between Kaston Iago and Justina, who is interviewing him about his background on the orders of Uvanov. The title of the story, meaning a fiction in which the author self-consciously alludes to the story's artificially, recalls once more the idea, as first alluded to back in Occam's Razor, that Iago might in fact be Kerr Avon from Blake's 7, and as such the story plays with the listener's expectation of this.

Other media

"Skulduggery" (short story)
Published in the 2006 charity anthology Shelf Life, "Skulduggery" by Fiona Moore and Alan Stevens centres on a scheme concocted by Carnell, at the behest of Landerchild, to assassinate Chairholder Uvanov using a skull covered in contact poison. The story takes place shortly before Death's Head and acts as a prelude to those events shedding additional light on the motives of its various characters.

Stage plays
In July 2012, stage play versions of The Robots of Death, adapted to include Kaston Iago and Elska Blayes in the place of the Doctor and Leela, and "Storm Mine", were performed at Fab Cafe and The Lass O'Gowrie by The Lass O'Gowrie Theatre Company, as part of the Greater Manchester Fringe Festival. The plays also attracted attention for cross-gendering many of the original characters.

External links
 Magic Bullet's website

References

Audio plays based on Doctor Who
Doctor Who locations
Fictional populated places